Barefoot in the Park is a romantic comedy by Neil Simon.

Barefoot in the Park may also refer to:
 Barefoot in the Park (film)
 Barefoot in the Park (TV series)
 "Barefoot in the Park" (song)